Dileep Kumar may refer to:

 A. R. Rahman (born 1967), born A. S. Dileep Kumar, Indian composer and philanthropist
 Dileep Kumar (politician), Indian politician
 Dilip Kumar (1922-2021), Indian film actor